A bookend is an object, or often one of a pair of objects, used to hold a row of books upright on a shelf, while Bookends is a 1968 album by Simon & Garfunkel.

Bookend or Bookends may also refer to:

Ends
Bookend terrace, an architectural term for a terrace of identical houses, framed at each end by a pair of enlarged houses
Framing device, an element of a story or musical composition occurring at its beginning and repeating at its end
Book end vortices, vortices that form at the ends of a large storm system or derecho

Sports
"Bookend", is a nickname for rugby league football's  position
Book End, the finishing move of professional wrestler Booker T

Computing
Bookends (software), reference management software for Mac OS

Books
Bookstop (company), a Texas-based chain of bookstores
Bookends, a 2002 novel by Jane Green, and spoken book read by Jacqueline King

Music

Albums
Bookends (album), a 1968 album by Simon & Garfunkel
Bookend, a 2011 album by Aska
Bookends, a 2002 jazz album by David Liebman and Marc Copland

Songs
"Bookends" (song), a song by Simon and Garfunkel
"Bookends", a song by Jerry Fuller, covered by Mark Lindsay
"Bookends", or "Book Ends", a song by Joe Walsh from The Smoker You Drink, the Player You Get
"Bookends", a song by Alfie from Bookends
"Bookends", a song by The Boggs from Forts
"Bookends", a song by Pullman from Viewfinder
"Book-Ends", by Cannonball Adderley from Pyramid